Maneybung, also spelled as Maneybong, is a village in West Sikkim district, Sikkim, India. As per the 2011 Census of India, the Maneybung village has a total population of 3,407 peoples with a literacy rate of 71.18%. The Maneybung village is governed by the Maneybung-dentam assembly constituency and the Sikkim parliamentary constituency.

References 

Villages in Gyalshing district